Assads is a small town and rural commune in Taroudant Province of the Souss-Massa-Drâa region of Morocco. At the time of the 2004 census, the commune had a total population of 5512 people living in 939 households.

Assads is the home place for the Moroccan citron.

References

Populated places in Taroudannt Province
Rural communes of Souss-Massa